The murexide test is an analytical technique to identify the presence of caffeine and other purine derivatives in a sample.  These compounds do not respond to the common alkaloid detecting tests such as Dragendorff's reagent. In this test the alkaloids are mixed with a tiny amount of potassium chlorate and a drop of hydrochloric acid.  The sample is then evaporated to dryness and the resulting residue is exposed to ammonia vapour. Purine alkaloids produce a pink color in this test.  Murexide (ammonium purpurate) with a purple color is also produced in this test.

Uses
Murexide test is a color test for uric acid and some other purines. The (solid) sample is first treated with conc. nitric acid, which is slowly evaporated away; subsequent addition of ammonia (NH3) gives a purple color if uric acid was present, due to formation of murexide, or a yellow color that turns to red on heating if a xanthine is present.

References

Analytical reagents